This is a list of public art in Torfaen in south-east Wales. Torfaen lies within the historic boundaries of Monmouthshire. It was formed in 1974 as a district of the county of Gwent and in 1996 it was reconstituted as a principal area and county borough. This list applies only to works of public art on permanent display in an outdoor public space and does not, for example, include artworks in museums.

Blaenavon

Cwmbran

Griffithstown

Old Cwmbran

Panteg

Pontnewydd

Pontypool

References

Torfaen
Torfaen